Nikka Singh is an Indian athlete. He won a gold medal in the 1500 metres in the 1951 Asian Games.

References

Asian Games medalists in athletics (track and field)
Athletes (track and field) at the 1951 Asian Games
Asian Games gold medalists for India
Medalists at the 1951 Asian Games
Possibly living people
Year of birth missing
Indian male middle-distance runners